Walter Cruickshank is an American academic and government administrator who is the Deputy Director of the Bureau of Ocean Energy Management in the United States Department of the Interior. He has served in that capacity since BOEM's establishment in October 2011.

He was the Deputy Director of the Minerals Management Service (later called the Bureau of Ocean Energy Management, Regulation and Enforcement) from April 8, 2002 until its dissolution on October 1, 2011. He was the Acting Director of that agency from June 2007 to July 2007 and again from January 2009 to July 2009. 

Cruickshank has a bachelor's degree from Cornell University and a Ph.D. in minerals management from Pennsylvania State University.

Sources
Bureau of Ocean Energy Management bio

Cornell University alumni
Pennsylvania State University alumni
Living people
United States Department of the Interior officials
Year of birth missing (living people)